Tristaniopsis vieillardii is a species of plant in the family Myrtaceae. It is endemic to New Caledonia.

References

Endemic flora of New Caledonia
vieillardii
Vulnerable plants
Taxonomy articles created by Polbot
Taxa named by Jean Antoine Arthur Gris
Taxa named by Adolphe-Théodore Brongniart